Wolves of the Deep is a 1959 Italian drama film directed by Silvio Amadio. It was entered into the 9th Berlin International Film Festival.

Cast
 Massimo Girotti as Comandante
 Folco Lulli as Nostromo
 Alberto Lupo as Radiotelegrafista
 Jean-Marc Bory as Tenente
 Horst Frank as Lo Sposino
 Piero Lulli as Teppista
 Giancarlo Sbragia as Idrofonista
 Giorgio Cerioni as Marinaio Ferito
 Nino Dal Fabbro as Meccanico
 Enrico Salvatore as Marinaio
 Alberto Barberini as Marinaio

References

External links

1959 films
1950s war films
Italian war films
1950s Italian-language films
Italian black-and-white films
Films directed by Silvio Amadio
World War II submarine films
Italian World War II films
1950s Italian films